Prior to the revision of the Anglican Church of Canada's (ACC) Book of Common Prayer (BCP) in 1962, the national church followed the liturgical calendar of the 1918 Canadian Book of Common Prayer. Throughout most of the twentieth century, the situation in Canada resembled that which pertained in much of the Anglican Communion: There was uncertainty as to whether post-Reformation figures (with the exception of the martyred Charles I) could or should be commemorated. In the words of the calendar's introduction, "New names have been added from the ancient calendars, and also from the history of the Anglican Communion, without thereby enrolling or commending such persons as saints of the Church."  The 1962 revision added twenty-six post-Reformation individuals, as well as commemorations of the first General Synod and of "The Founders, Benefactors, and Missionaries of the Church in Canada."  Of the calendar days, twenty-eight were highlighted as "red-letter days" — that is, days of required observation.

With the publication of the Book of Alternative Services (BAS) in 1985, a revised and expanded calendar was introduced. This was supplemented, in 1994, with the publication of For All The Saints; a book of propers, short biographies and descriptions of the commemorations, and readings by or about the individuals or events commemorated (there were also some very minor changes to the 1985 calendar).  As the BAS has largely supplanted the BCP for most Canadian Anglicans, so too has its calendar.  Nonetheless, the BCP calendar is still in use and individuals and parishes can legitimately choose to observe it.

The chief difference between the 1962 and 1985 calendars is the elimination of observations for several European figures, in order to include individuals of interest to the Canadian Church, and to the worldwide Anglican Communion. Similar to the Calendar of saints of the Church of England, the Patriarchs of Old are omitted in both the Book of Common Prayer and the newer Book of Alternative Services, for the Anglican Church of Canada.

In the ACC, the calendar is officially referred to as the Canadian Calendar of Holy Persons.

Book of Alternative Services Calendar

Days of observance
The revised calendar follows the Anglican custom of delineating between days of required observance ("red-letter days") and days of optional observance ("black letter days"). The way the calendar breaks these down is as follows:

Principal Feasts
Easter Day
Ascension Day
The Day of Pentecost (Whitsunday)
Trinity Sunday
All Saints Day
Christmas Day
Epiphany

Feasts of Our Lord
The Naming of Jesus
The Baptism of the Lord
The Presentation of the Lord
The Annunciation of the Lord
The Visit of the Blessed Virgin Mary to Elizabeth
The Birth of St. John the Baptist
The Transfiguration of the Lord
Holy Cross Day

Other Major Feasts
All Feasts of Apostles
All Feasts of Evangelists
The Holy Innocents
St. Joseph
St. Mary Magdalene
St. Stephen
St. Mary the Virgin
The Beheading of John the Baptist
St. Michael and All Angels

Fasts
Ash Wednesday and other weekdays of Lent and Holy Week
Good Friday and all other Fridays of the year, except in Christmas, Easter, and dominical Feasts

Days of Optional Observance ("black-letter days")
Memorials (first class days of optional observance)
Commemorations (second-class days of optional observance)
Rogation Days
Harvest Thanksgiving
Ember days

In addition, some parishes observe other days commemorated elsewhere in the Christian tradition, such as Corpus Christi, Lammas-day, etc. Some individual parishes have their own calendars, which include the names of individuals significant to the parish or its identity, with which they supplement the national calendar.

The calendar
The following is the calendar of the Anglican Church of Canada according to the Book of Alternative Services. On those days in which there are two commemorations, a pattern of alternating the observance by year is recommended.

January

February

March

April

May

June

July

August

September

October

November

December

1PF: Principal Feast; HD: Holy Day; Mem: Memorial; Com: Commemoration
2Added to the calendar by resolution of the Council of General Synod, May, 2005.

Book of Common Prayer Calendar

The calendar
The calendar of the Prayer Book stipulates: "When two lesser commemorations fall on the same day and it is desired to remember both, it is recommended that one of them be transferred to the nearest day before or after for which no special provision has been made."

January
1 The Octave Day of Christmas and Circumcision of our Lord, being New Year's Day.
6 The Epiphany of our Lord with commemoration of his Baptism in the Octave.
10 William Laud, Archbishop of Canterbury, Martyr 1645.
12 Benedict Biscop, Abbot and Scholar, 689.
John Horden, Missionary, first Anglican Bishop of Moosonee, 1893.
13 The Octave Day of the Epiphany.
Hilary, Doctor, Bishop of Poitiers, France, 368.
19 Henry, Missionary, Bishop in Finland, 1150.
21 (Agnes, Virgin and Martyr, Rome, c. 304.)
22 Vincent, Deacon and Martyr, Spain, c. 304.
24 St Timothy and St Titus, Apostolic men.
25 The Conversion of St Paul.
26 Polycarp, Bishop of Smyrna, Apostolic man, Martyr 155 or 156.
27 John Chrysostom, Doctor, Bishop of Constantinople, 407.
30 Charles Stuart, King, beheaded 1649.

February
2 The Presentation of Christ in the Temple, and the Purification of the Blessed Virgin Mary.
3 Anskar, Missionary, first Bishop in Sweden, 864.
11 Cædmon, first recorded Christian Poet in England, c. 680.
14 (Valentine, Bishop and Martyr.)
23 Lindel Tsen, Bishop in China, consecrated 1929; and Paul Sasaki, Bishop in Japan, consecrated 1935.
24 St Matthias the Apostle.
27 George Herbert, Pastor and Poet, 1633.

March
1 St David of Wales, Archbishop of Menevia, c. 544.
2 Chad, Missionary and first Bishop of Lichfield, 672.
John Wesley, Preacher, 1791; Charles Wesley, Poet, 1788.
6 Perpetua and her companions, Martyrs, Africa, 203.
7 Thomas Aquinas, Doctor and Poet, 1274.
12 Gregory the Great, Doctor, Bishop of Rome, 604.
17 St Patrick of Ireland, Missionary and Bishop, 461.
19 St Joseph of Nazareth, Spouse of the Blessed Virgin Mary.
Thomas Ken, Bishop of Bath and Wells, Poet, 1711.
20 Cuthbert, Missionary, Bishop of Lindisfarne, 687.
21 Benedict, Abbot of Monte Cassino, Italy, c. 540.
Thomas Cranmer, Translator and Reviser of the Liturgy, Archbishop of Canterbury, Martyr 1556.
25 The Annunciation of the Blessed Virgin Mary.
29 John Keble of Oxford, Scholar and Poet, 1866.

April
2 Henry Budd, first North American Indian to be ordained to the ministry, 1850.
3 Richard, Bishop of Chichester, 1253.
Reginald Heber, Bishop in India, Poet, 1826.
4 Ambrose, Doctor and Poet, Bishop of Milan, 397.
11 Leo the Great, Doctor, Bishop of Rome, 461.
19 Alphege, Archbishop of Canterbury, Martyr 1012.
21 Anselm, Doctor, Archbishop of Canterbury, 1109.
23 St George of England, Martyr c. 304.
25 St Mark the Evangelist

May
1 St Philip and St James, Apostles.
St James the Brother of the Lord, Martyr 62.
2 Athanasius, Doctor, Bishop of Alexandria, 373.
4 Monnica, the mother of Augustine of Hippo, 387.
9 Gregory of Nazianzus, Doctor, Bishop of Constantinople, 389.
11 Cyril and Methodius, Missionaries to the Slavs, 885.
12 Florence Nightingale, Nurse, 1910.
19 Dunstan, Archbishop of Canterbury, 988.
20 The Council of Nicaea, 325.
25 Aldhelm, Bishop of Sherborne, Scholar and Poet, 709.
26 Augustine, Missionary, first Archbishop of Canterbury 597–605.
27 Bede, Presbyter, Doctor and Historian, 735.
30 Joan of Arc, 1431.

June

1 Justin Martyr, Doctor, c. 165.
5 Boniface, Missionary, Bishop of Mainz, Germany, Martyr 754.
9 Columba, Abbot of Iona: Ireland and Scotland, 597.
11 St Barnabas the Apostle.
14 Basil the Great, Doctor, Bishop of Caesarea, Cappadocia, 379.
22 Alban, first recorded Martyr in Britain, c. 304.
24 The Nativity of St John the Baptist.
28 Irenaeus, Doctor, Bishop of Lyon, France, c. 200.
29 St Peter and St Paul the Apostles, Martyrs c. 64.

July
1 The Octave Day of St John the Baptist.
Confederation of Canada, 1867: Dominion Day.
2 The Visitation of the Blessed Virgin Mary to Elizabeth.
6 The Octave Day of St Peter and St Paul.
Thomas More, Chancellor of England, Martyr 1535.
9 Stephen Langton, Archbishop of Canterbury, 1228.
15 Swithun, Bishop of Winchester, c. 862.
20 (Margaret, Virgin and Martyr, Antioch of Pisidia.)
22 St Mary Magdalene.
25 St James the Apostle, Martyr 44.
26 (St Anne, the mother of the Blessed Virgin Mary.)
29 Olaf, King of Norway, Martyr 1030.
William Wilberforce, Emancipator of the Slaves, 1833.

August
1 Lammas Day.
The Maccabean Martyrs.
5 Oswald, King of Northumbria, Martyr 641.
6 The Transfiguration of our Lord.
7 The Name of Jesus.
10 Laurence, Archdeacon of Rome, Martyr 258.
12 Charles Inglis, first Anglican Bishop in Canada, consecrated 1787.
13 Hippolytus, Doctor, Bishop in Rome, Martyr 235.
Jeremy Taylor, Bishop of Down, Ireland, 1667.
15 The Falling Asleep of the Blessed Virgin Mary.
20 Bernard, Abbot of Clairvaux, France, Doctor and Poet, 1153.
24 St Bartholomew the Apostle.
28 Augustine, Doctor, Bishop of Hippo, Africa, 430.
Robert McDonald, Missionary in the Western Arctic, 1913.
29 The Beheading of St John the Baptist.
31 Aidan, Missionary, Bishop of Lindisfarne, 651.

September
1 Giles, Abbot, southern France, c. 720.
3 Robert Wolfall, Presbyter. First recorded Anglican Communion Service in Canada, Frobisher Bay, 1578.
8 The Nativity of the Blessed Virgin Mary.
10 Edmund James Peck, Missionary to the Eskimo, 1924.
13 Cyprian, Doctor, Bishop of Carthage, Martyr 258.
First General Synod of the Anglican Church of Canada, 1893.
14 Holy Cross Day.
16 Ninian, Missionary, first Bishop in Galloway, Scotland, c. 430.
19 Theodore of Tarsus, Archbishop of Canterbury, 690.
20 John Coleridge Patteson, Missionary, first Bishop of Melanesia, Martyr 1871.
21 St Matthew the Apostle and Evangelist.
25 Lancelot Andrewes, Bishop of Winchester, Translator of the Scriptures, 1626.
29 St Michael and All Angels.
30 Jerome, Doctor, Presbyter in Rome and Bethlehem, Translator of the Scriptures, 420.

October

1 Remigius, Bishop of Reims, France, c. 530.
4 Francis of Assisi, 1226.
6 William Tyndale, Translator of the Scriptures into English, Martyr 1536.
9 St. Denis of France, first Bishop of Paris, Martyr 272.
Robert Grosseteste, Scholar, Bishop of Lincoln, 1253.
10 Paulinus, Missionary, Archbishop of York, 644.
11 St. Philip of Caesarea, Apostolic man.
13 Edward the Confessor, King, Westminster, 1066.
16 Hugh Latimer and Nicholas Ridley, Bishops, Martyrs 1555.
17 Etheldreda, or Audrey, Queen, Abbess of Ely, 679.
18 St Luke the Evangelist.
25 (Crispin and Crispinian, Martyrs 285.)
26 Cedd, Missionary, Bishop of the East Saxons, 664.
Alfred, King of the West Saxons, 899.
28 St Simon the Zealot and St Jude, the Apostles.
St Jude the Brother of the Lord.
29 James Hannington, Missionary and Bishop, Martyr 1885.

November
1 All Saints.
2 All Souls: Commemoration of the Faithful Departed.
Richard Hooker, Doctor of the Church of England, 1600.
7 Willibrord, Missionary, Bishop of Utrecht, the Netherlands, 739.
8 The Octave Day of All Saints:
The Founders, Benefactors, and Missionaries of the Church in Canada.
11 Martin, Bishop of Tours, France, c. 397.
13 Charles Simeon of Cambridge, Pastor, 1836.
16 Hugh, Bishop of Lincoln, 1200.
Margaret, Queen of Scotland, 1093.
17 Hilda, Abbess of Whitby, 680.
20 Edmund, King of East Anglia, Martyr 870.
22 (Cecilia, Virgin and Martyr, Rome.)
23 Clement, Apostolic man, Bishop of Rome, c. 100.
25 (Catherine, Virgin and Martyr, Alexandria.)
30 St Andrew the Apostle.

December
4 Clement of Alexandria, Doctor, c. 210.
6 (Nicolas, Bishop of Myra, c. 342.)
8 The Conception of the Blessed Virgin Mary.
16 O Sapientia.
17 Ignatius, Bishop of Antioch, Martyr in Rome c. 115.
21 St Thomas the Apostle.
25 The Nativity of our Lord: Christmas Day.
26 St Stephen the Martyr.
27 St John the Apostle and Evangelist.
28 The Innocents.
29 Thomas Becket, Archbishop of Canterbury, 1170.
30 John Wycliffe of Oxford, Scholar, Translator of the Scriptures into English, 1384.
31 John West, Missionary, Red River, Canada, 1845.

Differences between the BCP and BAS

Changed dates of observation
Ambrose: From April 4 to December 7
Lancelot Andrewes: From September 25 to September 26
Thomas Aquinas: From March 7 to January 28
Basil the Great: From June 14 to January 2
Bede: From May 27 to May 25
Benedict: From March 21 to July 11
Clement of Alexandria: From December 4 to December 5
Cyril and Methodius: From May 11 to February 14
Founders, Benefactors, and Missionaries of the Church in Canada: From November 8 to September 18
Gregory the Great: From March 12 to September 3
Gregory of Nazianzus: From May 9 to January 2
Reginald Heber: From April 3 to April 4
Hilda of Whitby: From November 17 to November 18
Richard Hooker: From November 2 to November 3
Hugh of Lincoln: From November 16 to November 17
Henry of Finland: From January 13 to July 13
Ignatius of Antioch: From December 17 to October 17
James of Jerusalem: From May 1 to October 23
Thomas Ken: From March 19 to March 22
Leo the Great: From April 11 to November 10
Robert McDonald: From August 28 to August 30
Monnica: From May 4 to August 27
Name of Jesus From August 7 to January 1 (as the Naming of Jesus)
Charles Simeon: From November 13 to November 12
Thomas the Apostle: From December 21 to July 3
John and Charles Wesley: From March 2 to March 3
John Wyclyf: From December 30 to October 30
Visit of the Blessed Virgin Mary to Elizabeth: July 2 to May 31

Deletions
Aldhelm, Bishop, Scholar, and Poet, 709 (May 25)
Alphege, Abp of Canterbury, Martyr, 1012 (April 19)
First General Synod of the Anglican Church of Canada, 1893 (September 13)
Benedict Biscop, Abbot and Scholar, 689 (January 12)
Cædmon, Poet, 680 (February 11)
Catherine of Alexandria, Virgin, Martyr, 305 (November 25)
Cecilia, Virgin, Martyr, c. 180 (November 22)
Cedd, Missionary, Bishop, 664 (October 26)
Crispin and Crispinian, Martyrs, 285 (October 25)
Denis, Bishop, Martyr, 272 (October 9)
Ethelreda, Queen, Abbess, 679 (October 17)
Giles, Abbot, 720 (Sept. 1)
Robert Grosseteste, Scholar, Bishop, 1253 (October 9)
Hippolyte of Antioch, Bishop, Teacher of the Faith, Martyr, 235 (August 13)
Joan of Arc, Martyr, 1431 (May 30)
Lammas Day (August 1)
Stephen Langton, Abp of Canterbury, 1228 (July 9)
Hugh Latimer and Nicholas Ridley, Bishops, Martyrs, 1555 (October 16)
Maccabean Martyrs (August 1)
Margaret of Antioch, Virgin and Martyr, 304 (July 20)
The First Council of Nicea, 325 (May 20)
O Sapientia (December 16)
Olaf of Norway, Martyr, 1030 (July 29)
Oswald of Northumbria, Martyr, 641 (August 5)
Philip of Caesarea, Deacon, 1st Cy. (October 11)
Remigius, Bishop, 530 (October 1)
Swithun, Bishop, 862 (July 15)
William Tyndale, Educator, Martyr, 1536 (October 6)
St. Valentine, Bishop and Martyr (February 14)

References

Anglican Church of Canada, Book of Common Prayer, Toronto, 1962.
Anglican Church of Canada, Book of Alternative Services, Toronto, 1985.
Anglican Church of Canada, For All the Saints: Prayers and Readings for Saints' Days, Toronto, 1994.

Anglican Church of Canada
Canada